Kordkuy County is in Golestan province, Iran. The capital of the county is the city of Kordkuy. At the 2006 census, the county's population was 67,427 in 17,617 households. The following census in 2011 counted 70,244 people in 21,100 households. At the 2016 census, the county's population was 71,270 in 23,510 households.

Administrative divisions

The population history of Kordkuy County's administrative divisions over three consecutive censuses is shown in the following table. The latest census shows one district, three rural districts, and one city.

References

 

Counties of Golestan Province